The Tahiti Open is a professional golf tournament played in Tahiti, French Polynesia.

History
The Federation Polynesienne de Golf based in Papeete was founded in 1981 and launched the national open golf championship, the Tahiti Open, in 1982. The inaugural tournament was won by singer Danny Kaleikini from Hawaii. The tournament then consisted of two rounds, raised to four by the second edition which was won by Kalua Makalena, also from Hawaii. The tournament then consisted of three rounds for eight years, before returning to a four-round format in 1992 when the organizers started collaborating with the PGA Tour of Australasia.

Australian and New Zealand players have dominated the tournament. Grant Moorhead has won four times and Ryan Fox won both the 29th and 30th staging of the tournament, part of the Choice Hotels PGA Pro-Am Series. By 2018 the purse was $125,000, the largest prize purse in the PGA Tour of Australasia's Ladbrokes PGA Pro-Am Series.

Winners

Source:

References

External links

Golf tournaments in Tahiti
Recurring sporting events established in 1982